James Morton Maxwell (26 July 1887 – 21 April 1917) was a Scottish professional footballer who played in the Scottish League for Kilmarnock as an outside right. He also played in the Football League for The Wednesday and Woolwich Arsenal. He made one appearance for the Scottish League XI.

Personal life 
Maxwell was married with two children, one of whom, his son of the same name, nicknamed 'Bud', also became a footballer. Maxwell served as a lance corporal in the Seaforth Highlanders during the First World War and died of wounds suffered during the Battle of Istabulat on 21 April 1917. He is commemorated on the Basra Memorial. His elder brother Thomas was killed in Pas-de-Calais, France in 1918.

Career statistics

References 

Scottish footballers
1917 deaths
British Army personnel of World War I
British military personnel killed in World War I
Seaforth Highlanders soldiers
Scottish Football League players
Kilmarnock F.C. players
Sheffield Wednesday F.C. players
Footballers from East Ayrshire
Arsenal F.C. players
English Football League players
Galston F.C. players
Carlisle United F.C. players
Lanemark F.C. players
Nithsdale Wanderers F.C. players
Scottish Football League representative players
1887 births
Petershill F.C. players
Association football outside forwards
Newcastle United F.C. players